Mage Knight Dungeons is a 2002 board game published by WizKids.

Reception
Mage Knight Dungeons was reviewed in the online second volume of Pyramid.

Mage Knight Dungeons won the 2002 Origins Award for Best Graphic Presentation Of A Board Game Product.

References

Board games introduced in 2002
Origins Award winners